9–11 East 16th Street is a seven-story building between Union Square West and Fifth Avenue in the Ladies' Mile Historic District of Manhattan in New York City, just west of Union Square. The building was designed by Louis Korn for Martin Johnson and built between 1895 and 1896.

Gallery

References

1890s architecture in the United States
Buildings and structures in Manhattan
New York City Designated Landmarks in Manhattan
Union Square, Manhattan